The Great Good Place may refer to:
 The Great Good Place (book), 1989 book by Ray Oldenburg
 "The Great Good Place" (short story), 1900 short story by Henry James